Bixio Cherubini (27 March 1899 – 14 December 1987) was an Italian lyricist, playwright and poet.

Life and career 
Born in Leonessa,   Cherubini was a descendant of composer Luigi Cherubini. He started composing poems and lyrics during the World War I, in which he enlisted as a volunteer. After working several years in Rome as a Poste italiane employee, in 1927 he moved to Milan to focus on songwriting. Around this time he formed a successful professional relationship with Cesare Andrea Bixio, with whom he wrote classics such as "Tango delle capinere", "La canzone dell'amore", "Violino tzigano", "Trotta cavallino", "Mamma".

During World War II, Cherubini was active as a partisan with the Val Malchirolo brigade.

Bixio was also active as a playwright, specialized in revues.

References

External links

1899 births
1987 deaths
People from the Province of Rieti
Italian lyricists
Italian songwriters
Male songwriters
Italian record producers
Italian male conductors (music)
20th-century Italian conductors (music)
20th-century Italian male musicians